Juanita Hansen (born Juanita Cecilia Hanson; March 3, 1895 – September 26, 1961) was an American actress who performed in silent films. She became one of the Sennett Bathing Beauties and appeared in a variety of serials through the late 1910s. She was well known for her troubled personal life and struggle with addiction to cocaine and morphine. In 1934, she became clean and traveled lecturing on the dangers of drugs. She wrote a book about addiction and started her own charity to help raise awareness about drug abuse.

Early life
Juanita Cecilia Hanson was born in Thor, Iowa to Henry George Hanson, who was originally from Wisconsin, and Johanna Sophia Peterson (or Pederson) on March 3, 1895 or March 5, 1895 (sources differ). Alternatively, her birthplace has been given as Des Moines and her birth year as 1897. The family moved to California when Juanita was a young girl, and she attended Los Angeles High School, where she dropped out after completing 9th grade. 

She began acting in films when she was 16, and she secured her first acting job with L. Frank Baum's Oz Film Manufacturing Company. She took on the name Juanita Hansen, and appeared in The Patchwork Girl of Oz (1914), a film based on Baum's book, in a minor role as the bell ringer. Hansen next appeared in  The Magic Cloak of Oz, an adaptation of Queen Zixi of Ix.

Early in her career the actress was also associated with Famous Players-Lasky and acted with Jack Pickford. In 1915, Hansen appeared in six films. One of her early feature roles was in The Secret of the Submarine. The following year, her good looks landed her work as one of the Sennett Bathing Beauties doing comedy shorts at Keystone/Triangle Studios. Although she told reporters she liked working for Mack Sennett, she wanted to do more than slapstick comedy.

Serial career

After Hansen left Keystone, she began soon playing serious roles for Universal Studios. She starred in the 18-episode serial The Brass Bullet. The actress made seven films in 1919. Soon she was cast in the starring role of Princess Elyata in the 15-episode serial The Lost City, which was produced by William Selig, Harry Warner, Jack L. Warner, and Sam Warner. The serial was edited to seven reels and re-released in the form of the feature-length film The Jungle Princess. However, during this time, Hansen's increasingly reckless lifestyle led to a cocaine addiction that quickly overwhelmed her life.

Hansen's performance in the Universal productions led to a 1920 deal with Pathé to star with Warner Oland and William Bailey in the 15-episode serial The Phantom Foe. She made a second Pathé serial, The Yellow Arm (1921). In 1928, Hansen retired from movies after she was scalded in a bathroom accident in the Hotel Lincoln in New York City. She was awarded $109,269 in damages and interest following a long legal battle.

Personal problems
When she returned to work, behavioral problems caused by her drug addiction disrupted filming and ended her relationship with Pathé. She appeared in secondary roles in two more films, but by 1923 her film career was over at the age of 28. 

In 1923, Hansen wrote a nationally syndicated "lengthy account of her journey through addiction". She attributed her recovery to treatment by Dr. John Baker at Oakland Sanitarium. She also spent a year on the Pantages vaudeville circuit speaking about the dangers of addiction to drugs.

Her life became a series of constant ups and downs fighting her addictions. Hansen and Anna Luther were named as two co-respondents in a divorce suit brought by Evelyn Nesbit against Jack Clifford. Clifford left Nesbit in 1918, and she divorced him in 1933.

She began working in live theatre, appearing as The Lady in Black in the Broadway production The High Hatters (1928). Ten years after her last film in 1933, she was given a secondary role in the Monogram Pictures B-movie Sensation Hunters (1933). This, her first talkie, was her last film, and the ensuing years were marked by continual struggles with her drug addiction. In 1934, Hansen tried a comeback in movies but it was unsuccessful.

At one point, she attempted suicide with an overdose of sleeping pills. She survived, and the experience helped turn her around. Although her acting career was long over, and her drug habit had left her penniless, she took a job as a clerk for a railroad company. She also worked in the Works Progress Administration during the Great Depression. In 1940, she was living in Chicago at the Lorraine Hotel.

Later career and charitable work
Eventually, the former actress went public with her story. She created the Juanita Hansen Foundation to raise awareness of the dangers of drugs. She was jailed in 1937 on a narcotics charge but was cleared when she testified that tablets that police found in her purse were prescribed to her for medical purposes. She went on a lecture tour, crusading against traffic in illegal drugs.

In 1938 she wrote the book The Conspiracy of Silence, arguing that drug addicts should be sent to specialized medical institutions for treatment instead of being sent to prison.

Hansen died in 1961 at her home in West Hollywood, California, of heart failure. Her residence was 858 Hilldale Avenue. Her body was found by her maid, Pearl Edwards, who told deputy sheriffs the actress was suffering from a heart ailment. She was interred at Holy Cross Cemetery in Culver City, California. In the years before her death, she resided in a neighborhood only a few miles from where she once made motion pictures.

Filmography

Bibliography

References

 "Arrest Noted Film Actress As Hop User." Davenport Democrat and Leader. January 12, 1923, Page 19.
 "Star of Silent Films Juanita Hansen Dies." Los Angeles Times. September 27, 1961, Page 2.
 "Juanita Hansen, 66, Film-Serials Star." New York Times. September 28, 1961, Page 41.
 Hansen, Juanita and Preston Langley Hickey. The Conspiracy of Silence. Educational Associates. 1938.

External links

 
 
 1923 Autobiographical account of her drug addiction: Part I, Part II

1895 births
1961 deaths
American film actresses
American silent film actresses
American stage actresses
Burials at Holy Cross Cemetery, Culver City
Actresses from Des Moines, Iowa
20th-century American actresses
Film serial actresses
Vaudeville performers